RFA Wave Ruler is a  fast fleet tanker of the Royal Fleet Auxiliary (RFA) of the United Kingdom tasked with providing fuel, food, fresh water, ammunition and other supplies to Royal Navy vessels around the world.

Wave Ruler was built by Kvaerner Govan (after 1999, BAE Systems Marine) and launched in 2001. She was accepted into service in 2003 and is the second ship to bear this name in RFA service.

Wave Ruler was the last tanker commissioned into the RFA until  became operational in late 2017.

Design and description

Wave Ruler has a standard crew of 80 Royal Fleet Auxiliary personnel with provision for a further 22 Royal Navy personnel to conduct helicopter and weapons systems operations. She carries a full medical team and sick bay and is capable of distributing 2,000 emergency relief packages in times of crisis.

The ship has the capability to supply fuel and other liquid cargo to vessels using replenishment rigs on port and starboard beams and through a Hudson reel-type stern rig. When providing support for amphibious operations, Wave Ruler is also able to deliver fuel to dracones positioned alongside. In addition to fuel, the ship carries ammunition and other stores which can be transferred while underway. She can operate a Merlin HM1 helicopter, or other helicopters of similar size, from a hangar and flight deck at the stern.

Operational history

2003–2010

September 2004 saw Wave Ruler deployed to the Caribbean to provide hurricane relief operations.

In 2006 the ship carried out three major cocaine seizures at sea. In September it recovered £64m of cocaine from an estimated cargo of £500m, after the crew of the fishing boat carrying the drugs set it on fire. On 2 November the ship and its accompanying Royal Marines captured  of cocaine worth £300m. On 29 November it seized a further , again from a fishing boat. All the raids took place in the Caribbean.

The vessels distributed food, water and first aid supplies to victims of the disaster as well as providing support restoring local infrastructure. On 3 October 2008 the ship docked in Havana, Cuba. This was only the second time since the country's revolution 50 years earlier that a Royal Navy ship had visited the country. On 8 November 2008 the ship was sent to the Cayman Islands to provide humanitarian relief assistance in the wake of Hurricane Paloma.

During February 2010, Wave Ruler and the destroyer  were deployed to the Falkland Islands during a period of increased tension between the United Kingdom and Argentina over the former's plans to begin drilling for oil in the seas surrounding the islands. While in the South Atlantic, Wave Ruler took part in the rescue of an I-Kiribati sailor who was taken seriously ill, refuelling an RAF 1564 Search and Rescue Flight Sea King helicopter while in flight. The deployment also saw the ships visit Southern Thule in the Southern Sandwich Islands, the first British warships to visit the islands for nearly 10 years. November 2010 saw the vessel back in the Caribbean, where she distributed  of fresh water and 32,000 water purification tablets in St Lucia after the effects of Hurricane Tomas. The deployment also saw the vessel visit Antigua and the British Overseas Territory of Grand Cayman.

2011–present

Wave Ruler spent the summer and autumn of 2011 again in the Caribbean deployed as the United Kingdom's Atlantic Patrol Ship (North). She embarked a Mk 8 Lynx helicopter from 815 Naval Air Squadron for the duration.

The Gulf Readiness Tanker operates in support of UKMCC Bahrain. In January 2013, Wave Ruler was relieved by RFA Fort Victoria.

Wave Ruler remained east of Suez, operating with  until both ships were relieved by Fort Victoria in June 2015.

Wave Ruler spent the latter part of 2016 and early 2017 operating in Scottish waters and the English Channel in support of Flag Officer Sea Training (FOST). As of June 2020, Wave Ruler was reported to be in "reduced readiness" (reserve - base maintenance period) but maintained in good condition and available for reactivation. In February 2022, it was reported that Wave Ruler and her sister ship Wave Knight would be placed in "extended readiness" (uncrewed reserve).

Future
In June 2018 it was reported by the Brazilian press that the UK MoD had offered to sell one or both of the Wave-class tankers to Brazil. As early as 2010, BAE Systems had proposed providing Brazil with a variant of the Wave class, tailored to meet the specific aviation, stores and personnel requirements of the Brazilian Navy. Nevertheless, the ship was still part of the RFA fleet (though maintained in reserve) as of late 2021, with the 2021 defence white paper apparently having had no overt impact on that status.

References

External links

 Official Wave Ruler page at the Royal Navy's website
 RFA Wave Ruler on Operation Taurus returning from Singapore to the UK (Video)

 

Wave-class tankers
Tankers of the Royal Fleet Auxiliary
2001 ships